The 2007–08 Wake Forest Demon Deacons men's basketball team represented Wake Forest University in the 2007–08 NCAA Division I men's basketball season. The Demon Deacons, led by first-year head coach Dino Gaudio, played their games at  Lawrence Joel Veterans Memorial Coliseum, and were members of the Atlantic Coast Conference.

In first season under their new head coach (who replaced former coach Skip Prosser, who died in the off-season), the Deacons lost leading scorer from 2006–07, Kyle Visser, but brought in a good recruiting class (ranked 28th nationally by Scout.com), including guards Jeff Teague and Gary Clark, and forward James Johnson.

Roster

Schedule
Note:  Many Raycom games also available on ESPN Full Court and ESPN360.

Game summaries

Fairfield @ Wake Forest
November 9, 2007

LJVM Coliseum

Winston-Salem, North Carolina

Points

Starters

Bench

NC Central @ Wake Forest
November 19, 2007

LJVM Coliseum

Winston-Salem, NC

Points

Starters

Bench

Winston-Salem State @ Wake Forest

November 23, 2007

LVJM Coliseum

Winston-Salem, NC

Points

Starters

Bench

Wake Forest @ Iowa

November 26, 2007

Carver-Hawkeye Arena

Iowa City, IA

Points

Starters

Bench

Wake Forest @ Charlotte

November 29, 2007

Bobcats Arena

Charlotte, North Carolina

Points

Starters

Bench

USC Upstate @ Wake Forest

December 1, 2007

LJVM Coliseum

Winston-Salem, North Carolina

Points

Starters

Bench

Wake Forest @ #23 Vanderbilt

December 5, 2007

Memorial Gymnasium

Nashville, Tennessee

Points

Starters

Bench

Wake Forest @ Georgia

December 8, 2007

Stegeman Coliseum

Athens, Georgia

Points

Starters

Bench

Bucknell @ Wake Forest

December 16, 2007

LVJM Coliseum

Winston-Salem, North Carolina

Points

Starters

Bench

South Florida @ Wake Forest

December 19, 2007

LVJM Coliseum

Winston-Salem, North Carolina

Points

Starters

Bench

Virginia Tech @ Wake Forest

December 23, 2007

LVJM Coliseum

Winston-Salem, North Carolina

Points

Starters

Bench

Air Force @ Wake Forest

December 30, 2007

LVJM Coliseum

Winston-Salem, North Carolina

Points

Starters

Bench

Presbyterian @ Wake Forest

January 2, 2008

LVJM Coliseum

Winston-Salem, North Carolina

Points

Starters

Bench

Brigham Young @ Wake Forest

January 8, 2008

LVJM Coliseum

Winston-Salem, North Carolina

Points

Starters

Bench

Wake Forest @ Boston College

January 12, 2008

Silvio O. Conte Forum

Chestnut Hill, Massachusetts

Points

Starters

Bench

Wake Forest @ Maryland

January 15, 2008

Comcast Center

College Park, Maryland

Points

Starters

Bench

Florida State @ Wake Forest

January 20, 2008

LJVM Coliseum

Winston-Salem, North Carolina

Points

Starters

Bench

Wake Forest @ #25 Clemson

January 22, 2008

Littlejohn Coliseum

Clemson, South Carolina

Points

Starters

Bench

Miami @ Wake Forest

January 29, 2008

LJVM Coliseum

Winston-Salem, North Carolina

Points

Starters

Bench

Wake Forest @ North Carolina State

February 3, 2008

RBC Center

Raleigh, North Carolina

Points

Starters

Bench

Georgia Tech @ Wake Forest

February 6, 2008

LVJM Coliseum

Winston-Salem, North Carolina

Points

Starters

Bench

Virginia @ Wake Forest

February 9, 2008

LVJM Coliseum

Winston-Salem, North Carolina

Points

Starters

Bench

Wake Forest @ Florida State

February 14, 2008

Donald L. Tucker Center

Tallahassee, Florida

Points

Starters

Bench

#2 Duke @ Wake Forest

February 17, 2008

LJVM Coliseum

Winston-Salem, North Carolina

Points

Starters

Bench

Wake Forest @ #3 North Carolina

February 24, 2008

Dean Smith Center

Chapel Hill, North Carolina

Points

Starters

Bench

Maryland @ Wake Forest

February 28, 2008

LJVM Coliseum

Winston-Salem, North Carolina

Points

Starters

Bench

Wake Forest @ Georgia Tech

March 1, 2008

Alexander Memorial Coliseum

Atlanta, GA

Points

Starters

Bench

Wake Forest @ Virginia Tech

March 4, 2008

Cassell Coliseum

Blacksburg, VA

Points

Starters

Bench

NC State @ Wake Forest

March 8, 2008

LJVM Coliseum

Winston-Salem, NC

Points

Starters

Bench

Florida State vs. Wake Forest

March 13, 2008

Bobcats Arena

Charlotte, NC

Points

Starters

Bench

References

Wake Forest
Wake Forest Demon Deacons men's basketball seasons